The 1987 Hungarian Grand Prix was a Formula One motor race held at the Hungaroring on 9 August 1987. It was the ninth race of the 1987 Formula One World Championship.

The race was won by Brazilian driver Nelson Piquet, driving a Williams-Honda. His teammate, Briton Nigel Mansell, took pole position and led until he lost a wheel nut with six laps remaining. Piquet's compatriot Ayrton Senna finished second in a Lotus-Honda, with Frenchman Alain Prost third in a McLaren-TAG.

The win, Piquet's second in succession, extended his lead over Senna in the Drivers' Championship to seven points, with Mansell and Prost a further eleven points back.

Race summary
Before the race, Ayrton Senna informed Lotus that he would be leaving the team at the end of the year. Almost immediately, Lotus signed Senna's fellow Brazilian and Drivers' Championship leader, Nelson Piquet, who explained that he felt that Williams had not honoured his number one driver status in the team.

Piquet went on to take his second consecutive win in his Williams-Honda, after team-mate Nigel Mansell lost a wheel nut with six laps remaining. Senna finished second in his Lotus-Honda but 37 seconds behind Piquet, while Alain Prost took third in his McLaren-TAG.

Thierry Boutsen finished fourth in his Benetton-Ford, ahead of the Brabham-BMW of Riccardo Patrese. The final championship point was claimed by Derek Warwick in his Arrows-Megatron, who was battling with influenza and conjunctivitis. Jonathan Palmer claimed the Jim Clark Trophy points finishing seventh in his Tyrrell DG016 with team mate Philippe Streiff finishing ninth behind the second Arrows of Eddie Cheever. Italian driver Ivan Capelli was tenth in the March 871.

The win allowed Piquet to expand his championship points lead to seven over Senna and 18 over Mansell.

Classification

Qualifying

Race 
Numbers in brackets refer to positions of normally aspirated entrants competing for the Jim Clark Trophy.

Championship standings after the race

Drivers' Championship standings

Constructors' Championship standings

Jim Clark Trophy standings

Colin Chapman Trophy standings

References

Hungarian Grand Prix
Hungarian Grand Prix
Grand Prix
August 1987 sports events in Europe